The Barry Buccaneers are the athletic teams that represent Barry University, located in Miami Shores, Florida, United States, in NCAA Division II intercollegiate sports. The Buccaneers compete as members of the Sunshine State Conference. Barry has been a member of the SSC since 1988. Barry University currently competes in 12 intercollegiate sports for men and women.

History
Within the first 33 years of Buccaneer Athletics, Barry won 18 national championships. Barry has won 66 SSC titles in 14 different sports since it joined the SSC in 1988. They are the only conference school to hold a league title in all 12 sports that they have sponsored. The Buccaneers have also won the SSC Women's Mayor's Cup All-Sports Trophy on five occasions, in 1990–91, 1996–97, 1999–00, 2001–02 and 2005–06. In 2006–07, the Buccaneer men finally claimed a Mayor's Cup of their own, as none of the five teams finished outside the top three in the conference. The men were co-winners in 2008-09 for their second cup and took their third in 2010–11.

Championships
As of the 2019–20 season, Barry has won 22 national championships. Of those, women's soccer, volleyball, men's golf, men's tennis and women's tennis each claimed three titles, while rowing won a brace and women's golf captured their first. Men's tennis became the first sport at Barry to win NCAA Championships during undefeated seasons, doing so twice, in 2013 and 2015. Women's tennis set the program record for a perfect season in 2017, going 30–0.

Team championships

Notable Alumni
Multiple alumni of Barry's baseball team have gone on to play Major League Baseball, including pitcher Henry Owens, catcher Yan Gomes, pitcher Tyler Kinley, and second baseman Alex De Goti. MLB pitcher Josh James also briefly attended Barry before transferring to Western Oklahoma State College.

References

External links